The Central Park is a neighborhood in the City of Flint, Michigan.  It is bounded as follows: east of Caeser Chavez avenue, south of Kearsley street, west of Crapo street, and north of East Court street.

Description
Many of the houses in this neighborhood date back to the late 19th century, when the city of Flint was transitioning from horse-drawn carriage assembly to automobile manufacturing.  Currently, the central park neighborhood association is a collection of proud residents who meet monthly in promoting this viable area located between the college-cultural area and the downtown municipal and business center in which wide-ranging demographic groups from college students to retirees reside.

Flint, Michigan
Geography of Genesee County, Michigan